Washington County, known locally as South County, is a county located in the U.S. state of Rhode Island. As of the 2020 census, the population was 129,839. Rhode Island counties have no governmental functions other than as court administrative boundaries, which are part of the state government.

History

Washington County was created as Kings County in 1729 within the Colony of Rhode Island and Providence Plantations. It was renamed Washington County on October 29, 1781, in honor of George Washington. At the earliest stage of colonial settlement, the area was called "The Narragansett Country", named after the Naragansett tribe and its tributary tribe the Niantics, both of whom lived in the area.

Early land purchases in the Narragansett Country were effected by settlers after the establishment of Indian trading posts at Fort Neck in Charlestown, and at "Smith's Castle" in Wickford. A series of conflicts involving the Manisseans on Block Island gave that island to the Massachusetts Bay Colony for a number of years, before being transferred to the Rhode Island Colony under Newport County, and then finally to Washington County in 1959.

The borders of the Narragansett country were disputed for nearly 100 years among the colonies of Rhode Island, Connecticut, and Massachusetts. The Narragansetts had pledged their fealty to King Charles, and the area was known as "The King's Province" and was placed under the authority of Rhode Island "until the King's pleasure was further known". In 1664, a royal commission under Charles II stepped in to adjudicate these conflicting claims. The commission extinguished the claims of Massachusetts, and Rhode Island was granted jurisdiction until the commission finished processing Connecticut's appeals, which were not ended until 1726.  Settlements of King's Province were named to reflect the English Restoration, in honor of King Charles II. Towns reflecting this history include the two Kingstowns and Charlestown, as well as the villages of Kingston and West Kingston.

Washington County is also known in Rhode Island as "South County", though some definitions of South County include outside towns, such as East Greenwich in neighboring Kent County, and exclude towns within Washington County, such as New Shoreham.

Geography

It is the largest county in Rhode Island by total area. The county's topography ranges from flat along the shoreline to gently rolling hills farther inland. The highest point is a large area approximately 560 feet (171 m) above sea level in the Exeter neighborhood of Black Plain; the lowest point is sea level along the coast. The northern boundary west of Davisville is approximately 41.60°N.  The western boundary north of Westerly is approximately 71.79°W.

National protected areas
 Block Island National Wildlife Refuge
 John H. Chafee National Wildlife Refuge
 Ninigret National Wildlife Refuge
 Trustom Pond National Wildlife Refuge

Major Highways

Demographics

As of the 2010 United States Census, there were 126,979 people, 49,177 households, and 32,297 families residing in the county. The racial makeup of the county was 93.8% white, 1.6% Asian, 1.2% black or African American, 0.9% American Indian, 0.7% from other races, and 1.8% from two or more races. Those of Hispanic or Latino origin made up 2.4% of the population.

The largest ancestry groups were:

 27.8% Irish
 21.4% Italian
 19.9% English
 11.4% French
 10.8% German
 4.9% Portuguese
 4.8% Polish
 4.3% French Canadian
 3.5% Scottish
 2.9% Swedish
 2.7% American
 2.5% Scotch-Irish
 1.4% Russian

Of the 49,177 households, 28.6% had children under the age of 18 living with them, 52.2% were married couples living together, 9.5% had a female householder with no husband present, 34.3% were non-families, and 26.1% of all households were made up of individuals. The average household size was 2.45 and the average family size was 2.95. The median age was 42.3 years.

The median income for a household in the county was $70,285 and the median income for a family was $87,999. Males had a median income of $59,598 versus $44,851 for females. The per capita income for the county was $34,737. About 3.4% of families and 7.4% of the population were below the poverty line, including 6.3% of those under age 18 and 5.0% of those age 65 or over.

Communities

Towns
 Charlestown
 Exeter
 Hopkinton
 Narragansett
 New Shoreham
 North Kingstown
 Richmond
 South Kingstown (traditional county seat)
 Westerly

Census-designated places

 Ashaway
 Bradford
 Carolina
 Charlestown
 Hope Valley
 Hopkinton
 Kingston
 Misquamicut
 Narragansett Pier
 Quonochontaug
 Wakefield-Peacedale
 Watch Hill
 Weekapaug
 Westerly
 Wyoming

Other villages

 Alton
 Arcadia
 Ashaway
 Barberville
 Bethel
 Burdickville
 Canonchet
 Centerville
 Davisville
 Galilee
 Hamilton
 Hopkinton City
 Jerusalem
 Kenyon
 Lafayette
 Locustville
 Matunuck
 Moscow
 Peace Dale
 Point Judith
 Rockville
 Saunderstown
 Shannock
 Shelter Harbor
 Slocum
 South Hopkinton
 Usquepaug
 Wakefield
 West Kingston
 White Rock
 Wickford
 Wood River Junction
 Woodville

Politics
Similar to other counties in Rhode Island, Washington County votes Democratic in presidential elections, having last voted Republican in 1984.

|}

See also
 National Register of Historic Places listings in Washington County, Rhode Island

References

External links

 

 
Rhode Island counties
1729 establishments in Rhode Island
Counties in Greater Boston
Providence metropolitan area
Populated places established in 1729